ChemDraw is a molecule editor first developed in 1985 by David A. Evans and Stewart Rubenstein (later by the cheminformatics company CambridgeSoft).  The company was sold to PerkinElmer in the year 2011.  ChemDraw, along with Chem3D and ChemFinder, is part of the ChemOffice suite of programs and is available for Macintosh and Microsoft Windows.

Features of ChemDraw 12.0
 Chemical structure to name conversion
 Chemical name to structure conversion
 NMR spectrum simulation (1H and 13C)
 Mass spectrum simulation
 Structure cleanup
 Draw ligand Structure
 An extensive collection of templates, including style templates for most major chemical journals.
 Export to SVG
 Export to PDF (Mac Version only)

File format
The native file formats for ChemDraw are the binary CDX and the preferred XML-based CDXML formats.
ChemDraw can also import from, and export to, MOL, SDF, and SKC chemical file formats.

Plugins
SDK for ChemDraw enables third-party developers to write plugins. For example, - Quick HotKey helps to set up HotKeys in interactive mode, instead manually editing of text file. The Plugin site
appears to have been abandoned.

References

See also
Molecule editor

Chemistry software
Science software for macOS
Science software for Windows